Kostas Triantafyllopoulos (8 February 1956 – 21 August 2021) was a Greek actor.

Biography 
After studying at the Theodosiadis Drama School of Athens, he graduated in 1977 and played a wide variety of roles on stage from Greek tragedy, Aristophanes and Shakespeare to contemporary American drama (Eugene O'Neill, Arthur Miller, Tennessee Williams, Joyce Carol Oates, Thornton Wilder, Sam Shepard).

He performed frequently at the National Theatre of Greece, the National Theatre of Northern Greece and at many other major Greek theatres, appearing in both classics and new works. His most notable stage roles include: Joe Keller in All My Sons by Arthur Miller, Kilroy in Camino Real by Tennessee Williams, Erie Smith in Hughie by Eugene O'Neill, Frank Gulick in Tone Clusters by Joyce Carol Oates, Juror #3 in 12 Angry Men by Reginald Rose, Old Man in Fool for Love by Sam Shepard, Joseph Garcin in No Exit by Jean-Paul Sartre, Launce in The Two Gentlemen of Verona by William Shakespeare, Cardinal in The Duchess of Malfi by John Webster, Gilbert Horn in Knives in Hens by David Harrower, Creon in Oedipus at Colonus by Sophocles, Xanthias in The Frogs and Lamachus in The Acharnians both by Aristophanes.

From November 1998 to July 1999 and from July 2002 to March 2003 he participated in the world tours of the National Theatre of Greece with the tragedies Medea by Euripides (as Creon), Electra (as Paedagogus) and Antigone (as Guard) both by Sophocles. The tour included performances in France, Australia, Israel, Portugal, United States, Canada, Brasil, Germany, Italy, Cyprus, Denmark, Turkey, Bulgaria, China and Japan. Medea was well-received by the critics and especially by The New York Times.

He appeared in numerous Greek television series and films, such as Ela sti thesi mou, Ta mystika tis Edem, Kaneis de leei s' agapo, Peninta Peninta and Symmathites. He had also established himself as a voice actor, performing the Greek dubbing voices of numerous popular Disney characters such as Pete of the Mickey Mouse universe, Tigger in Winnie the Pooh, Mr. Potato Head in Toy Story, Don Carlton in Monsters University, Cogsworth in the Beauty and the Beast, Django in Ratatouille and Dr. Jumba Jookiba in Lilo & Stitch.

Work

Theatre (partial)

Filmography

Television (partial)

Film (partial)

Dubbing (partial) 
 Mickey Mouse TV series and films ... Pete
 ThunderCats ... Mumm-Ra
 The Transformers ... Optimus Prime
 Toy Story films ... Mr. Potato Head
 Winnie the Pooh films and TV series ... Tigger
 Monsters University ... Don Carlton
 Beauty and the Beast ... Cogsworth
 Lilo & Stitch films and TV series ... Dr. Jumba Jookiba
 A Bug's Life ... Heimlich
 Alpha and Omega ... Tony
 Sammy's Adventures: The Secret Passage ... Slim
 Shark Bait ... Jack
 Aladdin ... Fruit Shop Merchant
 Hercules ... Nessus, Cyclops
 The Hunchback of Notre Dame ... Additional voices
 Mulan ... Additional voices
 Happy Feet ... Additional voices

Sources

External links 
 

1956 births
2021 deaths
Greek male film actors
Greek male stage actors
Greek male television actors
Greek male voice actors
People from Arcadia, Peloponnese